Kelly Lee Owens (born 24 August 1988) is a Welsh electronic musician and producer. She released her self-titled first album in 2017 to critical praise, her follow-up album Inner Song was released in August 2020. Her third studio album LP.8 was released on 29 April 2022.

Early life 
Owens was born on 24 August 1988 in Rhuddlan, Flintshire on the North Wales coast. Owens recalls writing poetry as a child and that being out in nature (in her mother's fields) gave her the time and the solitude to write. As a teenager, she sang in her school choir and played bass and drums.

Owens grew up in a nearby small village where, she describes, "everyone knows everyone else". She began working at 14 as a waitress and spent her teenage years "involved in the 2006/2007 indie scene".

At age 19, Owens moved from Wales to Manchester to work at a cancer treatment hospital. While working as an auxiliary nurse, Owens would use her paid leave to help run local indie festivals. It was the patients who would ultimately urge her to pursue her music career.

Career 
Owens left her career as an auxiliary nurse in a cancer ward in Manchester to pursue music in 2009. After moving to London, she interned at XL Recordings and worked at various record stores including Pure Groove. During that time, Owens played bass in the indie band The History of Apple Pie.

It was during those early days in London that Owens met Daniel Avery, James Greenwood (aka "Ghost Culture"), and Erol Alkan. Avery and Greenwood, with whom she manned the counter at the now closed Pure Groove, brought her into the studio and introduced her to production software and Greenwood offered to be her sound engineer. Avery would later invite her to collaborate on his 2013 album Drone Logic. Owens released the Oleic EP a year later, in 2016.

Her eponymous album Kelly Lee Owens was released in March 2017 by the Norwegian label Smalltown Supersound. Later in 2017, she released a bonus cut from her album titled "Spaces". The second track on Kelly Lee Owens, "Arthur", is a tribute to the late Arthur Russell. The British luxury fashion house Alexander McQueen used the track "Arthur" for their Fall 2016 runway show prior to the release of the studio album. Avery has a co-write credit on "Keep Walking" and Jenny Hval appears on "Anxi".

Owens has collaborated with St. Vincent, whose single "New York", from the album Masseduction, she remixed. She also collaborated with Björk on her EP dedicated to remixes of "Arisen My Senses" from her album Utopia, and Welsh-born John Cale on the track "Corner of my Sky", from her album Inner Song.

Owens' music has been described as dream pop, techno pop, and has been compared to the work of Arthur Russell. She has expressed interest in the connection between healing and music. In 2017, she told Pitchfork that she was considering an exhibition on the “relationship between sound, healing, and resonant frequencies". She has stated that she enjoys sampling music on her iPhone. On 24 March 2020 Owens announced that her second album Inner Song would be released on 28 August.

On 28 October 2021, Owens released "Unity", the theme song for the 2023 FIFA Women's World Cup in Australia and New Zealand same day as the unveiling of the event's official emblem and slogan: "Beyond Greatness".

Owens announced her third studio album LP.8 in late March 2022, for release in digital format on 29 April and in physical format on 10 June She co-produced the album with noise artist Lasse Marhaug.

In spring 2023, Owens will be supporting Depeche Mode on their upcoming North American Memento Mori tour.

Personal life 
Owens currently resides in London. She can read and write Welsh although she describes herself as "not fluent".

Discography

Studio albums

Remix albums

Extended plays

DJ Mixes

Singles

As lead artist

As featured artist

Remixes

Notes

References

External links
 
 

Living people
People from Rhuddlan
21st-century Welsh women singers
21st-century bass guitarists
British electronic musicians
Women bass guitarists
Welsh bass guitarists
British women in electronic music
Welsh electronic musicians
Smalltown Supersound artists
1988 births